Boldyn Javkhlantögs (born 14 April 1964) is a Mongolian wrestler. He competed at the 1988 Summer Olympics and the 1992 Summer Olympics.

References

1964 births
Living people
Mongolian male sport wrestlers
Olympic wrestlers of Mongolia
Wrestlers at the 1988 Summer Olympics
Wrestlers at the 1992 Summer Olympics
Place of birth missing (living people)
Asian Games medalists in wrestling
Wrestlers at the 1990 Asian Games
Asian Games silver medalists for Mongolia
Medalists at the 1990 Asian Games
21st-century Mongolian people
20th-century Mongolian people